The music of Epirus, in Epirus, northwestern  Greece, present to varying degree in the rest of Greece and the islands, contains folk songs that are mostly pentatonic and polyphonic, characterized as relaxed, gentle and exceptionally beautiful, and sung by both male and female singers. 

Distinctive songs include lament songs (mirolóyia), shepherd's songs (skáros) and drinking songs (tis távlas). The clarinet is the most prominent folk instrument in Epirus, used to accompany dances, mostly slow and heavy, like the menousis, fisouni, podhia, syrtos sta dyo (pogonisios), syrtos sta tria, zagorisios, kentimeni, koftos, yiatros and tsamikos. Other instruments used are violin, floghera and sterianó laouto. Notable composers include clarinist Petroloukas Chalkias and laouto player Vasilis Kostas.

The polyphonic song of Epirus constitutes one of the most interesting musical forms, not only for the east Mediterranean and the Balkans, but also for the worldwide repertoire of the folk polyphony like the yodeling of Switzerland. Besides its scale, what attests to its very old origin is its vocal, collective, rhetorical and modal character.

The corresponding dances are slow and stately; they are invariably danced in counter-clockwise circles.  Women's dances are especially noble, allowing for a minimum of leg and arm movement, and calling for formal traditional attire: ankle-length black coats, gold thread tuques with a single long tassel, and hammered gold jewellery.

References

Further reading 
 World Music: The Rough Guide  by Simon Broughton, Mark Ellingham - 1999 - 
 Greek Folk Dances by Rickey Holden, Mary Vouras – 1965
 Engendering Song: Singing and Subjectivity at Prespa by Jane C. Sugarman,1997,

External links
Greek traditional music from Epirus
Songs from Politsani
Epirus Music
"Deropolitissa", Greek traditional song from Epirus
Skaros, Greek traditional shepherd's song from Epirus
Moiroloi, Greek traditional lament song from Epirus

Greek music
Epirus